Lamiya Haji Bashar (Arabic: لمياء حجي بشار) is a Yazidi human rights activist. She was awarded the Sakharov Prize jointly with Nadia Murad in 2016.

Biography
Haji Bashar is from Kojo, near Sinjar, Iraq.  In August 2014, along with Nadia Murad, she was abducted by Islamic State from the village and forced into sexual slavery. She was also forced to make suicide vests.

Aided by her family who paid local smugglers, she escaped in April 2016, being injured by a land mine in the process. She received medical treatment in Germany. In October 2016, she and Murad were jointly awarded the Sakharov Prize;  the ceremony took place in December 2016.

See also 

Genocide of Yazidis by ISIL

References

Living people
Iraqi Kurdish people
Iraqi human rights activists
Iraqi Yazidis
German Yazidis
Sexual abuse victim advocates
Women in Iraq
People from Nineveh Governorate
1998 births
Women human rights activists
Landmine victims
Sakharov Prize laureates
21st-century Kurdish women politicians
Kurdish human rights activists
Kurdish women's rights activists
Yazidi women